Michal Kadlec (born 13 December 1984) is a Czech professional footballer who plays as a defender for Czech club 1. FC Slovácko. He previously played for Sparta Prague, Bayer Leverkusen and Fenerbahçe.

Kadlec made his senior debut in 2007. He has scored 8 goals in 69 caps for the Czech Republic, representing them at two (2012 and 2016) UEFA European Championships.

Early life
Kadlec was born in 1984 in Vyškov. After his father, Miroslav Kadlec, joined 1. FC Kaiserslautern in 1990, the family moved to Germany in the Kaiserslautern area. Kadlec learned German in kindergarten before he went to school a year later. After his time in Grundschule, he went to the Gymnasium.

In 1998, Kadlec's father signed for FK Drnovice and so he returned to the Czech Republic.

Club career

Kadlec started his professional career in Slovácko and made his debut in a match against Baník Ostrava. In 2005, he joined Sparta Prague.

On 14 June 2013 he joined Fenerbahçe for a €4.5 million transfer fee, signing a three-year contract worth €2.1 million per season.

International career
On 17 November 2007, Kadlec was called up to the Czech national team for a game against Slovakia, and made his debut in a 3–1 victory (scoring an own goal). He scored his first goal in a win over Scotland on 30 May 2008 (also 3–1).

On 16 June 2012, against Poland in the European Championship, Kadlec headed a ball off the line in the dying seconds, preserving the Czechs' spot in the quarter-finals of the tournament. The strike had beaten goalkeeper Petr Čech and appeared to be headed to the inside of the far post; had it been scored then Poland would have ensured a draw, and the Czech Republic would have been eliminated from the tournament.

Sponsorship
On 11 July 2013, EA Sports announced that Kadlec would feature on the Czech cover of FIFA 14, alongside global cover star Lionel Messi.

Career statistics

Club

International goals

Honours

Club
Sparta Prague
 Gambrinus liga: 2004–05, 2006–07
 Czech Cup: 2005–06, 2006–07

Fenerbahçe
 Süper Lig: 2013–14
 Turkish Super Cup: 2014

Slovácko
 Czech Cup: 2021–22

References

External links

 
 Sparta Prague profile 
 
 

Living people
1984 births
People from Vyškov
Association football defenders
Czech footballers
Czech Republic youth international footballers
Czech Republic under-21 international footballers
Czech Republic international footballers
1. FC Slovácko players
AC Sparta Prague players
Bayer 04 Leverkusen players
Fenerbahçe S.K. footballers
Expatriate footballers in Germany
Expatriate footballers in Turkey
Bundesliga players
UEFA Euro 2008 players
UEFA Euro 2012 players
UEFA Euro 2016 players
Czech First League players
Süper Lig players
Czech expatriate sportspeople in Germany
Czech expatriate sportspeople in Turkey
Czech expatriate footballers
SV Alsenborn players
Sportspeople from the South Moravian Region